The 2010 Indianapolis Grand Prix was the eleventh round of the 2010 Grand Prix motorcycle racing season. It took place on the weekend of August 27–29, 2010 at the Indianapolis Motor Speedway.

During a support event for MotoGP, the second of two United States Grand Prix Racer Union 250cc (age 12–18) races during the race meet on August 29, 13-year-old Peter Lenz was killed during the warmup lap before the start.  It was the first competitor fatality at the Speedway during a race since 1973.

MotoGP classification

Moto2 classification
An eight-motorcycle crash in the Snake Pit at the start (#34 R. Hayden, #29 Iannone, #2 Talmácsi, #52 Pešek, #61 Ivanov, #3 Corsi, #48 Tomizawa, #56 Ranseder) led to a red flag and two retirements (Tomizawa and Ranseder) immediately. It was later restarted, with the distance shortened to 17 laps.

125 cc classification
Marc Márquez was given a 20-second penalty after the race for cutting the track.

Championship standings after the race (MotoGP)
Below are the standings for the top five riders and constructors after round eleven has concluded.

Riders' Championship standings

Constructors' Championship standings

 Note: Only the top five positions are included for both sets of standings.

References

Indianapolis motorcycle Grand Prix
Indianapolis
Indianapolis motorcycle Grand Prix
Indianapolis motorcycle Grand Prix